Abdourahamane Diallo  was a Guinean physician and politician. Born in Dalein, Labé. 

He served in the first council of the Politburo of the First Republic of Guinea as Minister of Cooperation from 1957.

References

Guinean physicians
Government ministers of Guinea
Possibly living people
Year of birth missing